Jon Paul Fontas (born April 16, 1955) is an American retired professional ice hockey player who played two games in the National Hockey League (NHL) for the Minnesota North Stars, one each in the 1979–80 and 1980–81 seasons. The rest of his career, which lasted from 1978 to 1985, was spent in the minor leagues and later in Finland.

Prior to his NHL career, Fontas played college ice hockey for the University of New Hampshire Wildcats between 1974 and 1978. He was inducted into the university's Sports Hall of Fame in 1997.

Fontas is now a coach and hockey instructor in New Hampshire.

Career statistics

Regular season and playoffs

References

External links 
 

1958 births
Living people
American men's ice hockey centers
New Hampshire Wildcats men's ice hockey players
Baltimore Clippers (1979–81) players
Ice hockey players from Massachusetts
Jokerit players
Jokipojat players
Minnesota North Stars players
Oklahoma City Stars players
People from Arlington, Massachusetts
Saginaw Gears players
SaiPa players
Sportspeople from Middlesex County, Massachusetts
Undrafted National Hockey League players